Hider in the House is a 1989 psychological thriller directed by Matthew Patrick and starring Gary Busey and Mimi Rogers.

Plot

A recently released psychiatric patient named Tom Sykes creates a home for himself in the attic of the Dreyer family's newly built house. He uses electronic devices to spy on them. Tom murders the Dreyer's beloved dog Rudolph, when Rudolph attempts to defend his family against the titular hider. After that, Tom starts to focus his attention on the mom, Julie, going so far as to watch her skinny dip in the pool. He interferes secretly in the relationship between Julie and her husband, Phil, planting bogus evidence of secret love affairs. He befriends the Dreyers' son Neal and teaches him fighting techniques. After two explosive arguments, Phil leaves the house and moves into a hotel. Seeing this as an opportunity, Sykes pretends to be a visitor who lives a couple of blocks over. His attempt to insinuate himself into their lives works at first, although the creepy neighbor Gene is the only one who distrusts him. Sykes murders two people who had accidentally discovered his bizarre goings-on and finally Julie becomes sufficiently suspicious to reject his advances. Tom loses it, and he tries to kill Julie. Phil shows up and tries to defend Julie, but Tom bludgeons him, breaking his leg. Julie gets a gun and shoots Tom in the chest, apparently killing him. The police and the ambulance arrive, summoned by Gene. Tom, still alive, awakes and desperately tries to kill both Julie and himself, but is once more thwarted when the police shoot him dead, saving Julie. Phil, who is alive but barely conscious, is taken to the hospital while Tom's body is taken to the morgue.

Cast
Gary Busey as Tom Sykes 
Jake Busey as Tom Sykes as a teenager
Mimi Rogers as Julie Dreyer 
Michael McKean as Phil Dreyer 
Kurt Christopher Kinder as Neil Dreyer 
Candace Hutson as Holly Dreyer 
Elizabeth Ruscio as Rita 
Chuck Lafont as Dr. Gordon 
Bruce Glover as Gene Hufford

Production
A psychologist was hired as an adviser to make the sure the psychology of the Tom Sykes character was as realistic as possible. After a meeting with the psychologist, Gary Busey was excited, saying it was a "NAR film." He explained that NAR meant "No acting required." Gary said: "I am the character!"

Writing
Hider in the House was the directorial debut of Matthew Patrick, who also reworked the film's script. One of the main things that was changed was that Tom Sykes, the main character and primary antagonist of the film, was originally more sympathetic. The original script showed that he grew up in an abusive household and his actions were motivated by a desperate craving for a family of his own. Because of this, he is unaware of his own strength and if he acts violently, it is done out of fear of a perceived threat. Originally, the film ended with Sykes redeeming himself. In the original ending, Sykes attempted to burn down the house with the family in it, recreating what he did to his abusive family when he was a child. However, when he sees the terrified faces of the family, he realizes that he has become as evil as his parents. Though he has been rejected, he still loves this family. He pushes them out the window to safety. As he watches them kiss and hug each other, Tom realizes he can never be a part of them, and lets the house burn down around him, killing himself. Although the studio was very supportive of the film director Matthew Patrick wanted to make, the studio eventually decided to have a more commercially safe Fatal Attraction-style ending, where Sykes becomes evil beyond redemption, attempts to murder the family and is eventually shot dead. This is eventually what was filmed and put into the film. A couple years later, Matthew Patrick saw the film's executive producer, Steven Reuther, again at the Academy Awards. Reuther said, "you know what… I think you were right… that would have made a better ending." On this, Patrick said: "I really admire Steve, that he could say that."

Release
The film was scheduled to be released in 1,200 theaters in the United States. Vestron was in financial trouble at the time and the movie was shelved, never receiving a theatrical release in the United States, and was screened only at film festivals. The film had a previous distribution agreement and was released theatrically in Europe, but only played for a week in a theater before it was pulled. It was given a U.K. cinema release on October 9, 1989 and an 18 rating.
The film received excellent reviews and notices wherever it opened.

Hider in the House'''s earnings have never been confirmed. 
The movie won a Saturn Award for best home video release, which director Matthew Patrick only discovered many years later, after he was on the Director's Guild.

Home media
In 1991, the film was released on videocassette (VHS) and laserdisc by Vestron Video. The film was then released in 2001 on DVD in the United Kingdom. Lions Gate Home Entertainment has yet to announce any plans for a Region 1 DVD release.

Reception
Critical response
In a Variety'' review, the film was praised as "an intelligent, gripping and sometimes compelling psychological thriller" with "attractive performances" by Rogers and Busey and that Matthew Patrick "directs with a good deal of thought and intelligence and does not rely on violence or shock value."

See also
 List of films featuring home invasions

References

External links

1989 films
1989 horror films
American psychological horror films
Films scored by Christopher Young
Films with screenplays by Lem Dobbs
1980s English-language films
1980s American films